Legal benefit is a legal term that means the obtaining by the promisor of that which he had no prior legal right to obtain.

Legal terminology